Khabarovka (Ülegem) is a rural locality (a selo) and the administrative centre of Khabarovskoye Rural Settlement, Ongudaysky District, the Altai Republic, Russia. The population was 274 as of 2016. There are 4 streets.

Geography 
Khabarovka is located 18 km southeast of Onguday (the district's administrative centre) by road. Ulita is the nearest rural locality.

References 

Rural localities in Ongudaysky District